The following table shows the world record progression in the men's indoor 60 metres, as recognised by the IAAF. The IAAF have officially ratified world indoor records since 1 January 1987; previous to this, they were regarded as world indoor bests.

Pre-IAAF

World record progression 1966–

Notes

References

world record
60 metres